Roger Viel (27 October 1902 – 3 October 1981) was a French athlete. He competed at the 1924 and 1928 Olympics in the 400 m hurdles and pentathlon with the best achievement of 16th place in the pentathlon in 1924.

References

1902 births
1981 deaths
Athletes (track and field) at the 1924 Summer Olympics
Athletes (track and field) at the 1928 Summer Olympics
Olympic athletes of France
French male hurdlers
French decathletes
Sportspeople from Caen
20th-century French people